Warts and All: Volume 3 is the third volume in a collection of commercially released, full-concert live albums by the American jam band Moe. It was recorded live on November 13, 1998 at the Vic Theater in Chicago, Illinois. This set features the first released version of the instrumental, "CalifornIA".

Track listing

Disc one
 32 Things
 Nebraska
 Timmy Tucker ->
 CalifornIA ->
 Moth

Disc two
 intro
 Plane Crash
 Threw It All Away
 Hi and Lo 
 Head
 Buster ->
 Jam
 Sensory Deprivation Bank

Disc three
 Big World
 witty banter
 Tambourine
 I Know You Rider
Hidden Track(s): Dr. Graffenburg -> Four -> Rebubula (recorded live on 9-12-98)

Personnel
Moe
Vinnie Amico – drums
Rob Derhak – bass, vocals
Chuck Garvey – guitar, vocals, photography, illustrations
Al Schnier – guitar, vocals
Fred Kevorkian – mastering
Steve Young – engineer, mixing
Becca Childs Derhak – art direction

External links
album at the band website
Warts and All: Volume 3 download @ Disc Logic

Moe (band) live albums
2003 live albums